The Blue Mountain Conference (BMC) is a high school athletic conference located in the U.S. state of Oregon. The conference operates under the guidelines of the Oregon School Activities Association (OSAA) and competes in the 2A classification, which has five regional conferences throughout the state.  The BMC is the easternmost 2A athletic conference in Oregon and consists of the following high schools:
Elgin High School
Enterprise High School
Heppner Junior/Senior High School
Irrigon Junior/Senior High School
Pilot Rock High School
Stanfield Secondary School
Union High School
Weston-McEwen High School

The BMC began its inaugural year of competition in the 2006–2007 school year, when the OSAA changed the number of classifications from four to six, setting up a completely new structure for athletics in Oregon for schools of all sizes.  The BMC is currently made up of schools that were members of the (now defunct) Columbia Basin Conference and Wapiti League under the four class system. Other former members of the Columbia Basin Conference and Wapiti Leagues were placed in different conferences under the new OSAA classification realignment.

References
OSAA Districts.

External links
Oregon Prep Sports
Oregon School Activities Association

High school sports in Oregon
High school sports conferences and leagues in the United States
2006 establishments in Oregon